The discography of English singer, songwriter, and musician Anna Calvi includes four studio albums, two extended plays, and eleven singles.

Studio albums

EPs

Singles

Recording features

Film syncs

References

External links
 

Rock music discographies
Discographies of British artists